Damdinsürengiin Orgodol (born 17 December 1956) is a Mongolian former cyclist. He competed in the team time trial event at the 1980 Summer Olympics.

References

External links
 

1956 births
Living people
Mongolian male cyclists
Olympic cyclists of Mongolia
Cyclists at the 1980 Summer Olympics
Place of birth missing (living people)
20th-century Mongolian people